
t Ganzenest is a restaurant in Rijswijk, Netherlands. It is a fine dining restaurant that was awarded one Michelin star in 1994 and retained that rating until 2002 and regained it in 2022.

The owner and head chef of t Ganzenest was Harry Visbeen.

The restaurant was formerly located in The Hague, at the addresses Groenewegje 75-a and Groenewegje 115. It moved to Rijswijk in 1999.

The restaurant closed in 2007, due to financial troubles and the threat of bankruptcy caused by a recession.

See also
List of Michelin starred restaurants in the Netherlands

References 

Restaurants in Rijswijk
Michelin Guide starred restaurants in the Netherlands
Defunct restaurants in the Netherlands